Kyrkjeskipet Peak is a peak in Antarctica just north of Kapellet Canyon that dominates the northeastern part of Jøkulkyrkja Mountain in the Mühlig-Hofmann Mountains of Antarctica. It was mapped from surveys and air photos by the Sixth Norwegian Antarctic Expedition (1956–60) and named Kyrkjeskipet (the church nave).

See also
 List of mountains of Queen Maud Land

References

External links
 Scientific Committee on Antarctic Research (SCAR)

Mountains of Queen Maud Land